The history of the Maldives is intertwined with the history of the broader Indian subcontinent and the surrounding regions, comprising the areas of South Asia and Indian Ocean; and the modern nation consisting of 26 natural atolls, comprising 1194 islands.  Historically, the Maldives had a strategic importance because of its location on the major marine routes of the Indian Ocean. The Maldives' nearest neighbours are the British Indian Ocean Territory, Sri Lanka and India. The United Kingdom, Sri Lanka and some Indian kingdoms have had cultural and economic ties with the Maldives for centuries. In addition to these countries, Maldivians also traded with Aceh and many other kingdoms in, what is today, Indonesia and Malaysia. The Maldives provided the main source of cowrie shells, then used as a currency throughout Asia and parts of the East African coast. Most probably Maldives were influenced by Kalingas of ancient India who were earliest sea traders to Sri Lanka and the Maldives from India and were responsible for the spread of Buddhism. Stashes of Chinese crockery found buried in various locations in the Maldives also show that there was direct or indirect trade contact between China and the Maldives. In 1411 and 1430, the Chinese admiral Zheng He 鄭和 visited the Maldives. The Chinese also became the first country to establish a diplomatic office in the Maldives, when the Chinese nationalist government based in Taipei opened an embassy in Malé in 1966. This office has since been replaced by the embassy of the People's Republic of China.

After the 16th century, when colonial powers took over much of the trade in the Indian Ocean, first the Portuguese, then the Dutch, and the French occasionally meddled in local politics. However, this interference ended when the Maldives became a British Protectorate in the 19th century and the Maldivian monarchs were granted a good measure of self-governance.

The Maldives gained total independence from the British on 26 July 1965. However, the British continued to maintain an air base on the island of Gan in the southernmost atoll until 1976. The British departure in 1976 at the height of the Cold War almost immediately triggered foreign speculation about the future of the air base. The Soviet Union requested the use of the base, but the Maldives refused.

The greatest challenge facing the republic in the early 1990s was the need for rapid economic development and modernisation, given the country's limited resource base in fishing and tourism. Concern was also evident over a projected long-term sea level rise, which would prove disastrous to the low-lying coral islands.

Early Age

Much of the history of the Maldives is unknown, however based on tales and actual data, we can deduce that the islands have been inhabited for over 2500 years, according to an old folklore from the Maldives' southern atoll. Allama Ahmed Shihabuddine (Allama Shihab al-Din) of Meedhoo on Addu Atoll wrote down this account in Arabic during Sultan Ibrahim Iskandar I's rule in the 17th century. Kitab Fi al-Athari Midu al-Qadimiyyah was the title of Allama Shihabuddine's book ("On the Ancient Ruins of Meedhoo"). The account is strikingly consistent with known South Asian history, including referencing Emperor Asoka, the legendary Indian emperor. It also backs up parts of the facts found in old Maldivian records and the loamaafaanu copperplates. Legends from the past, facts written on old copperplates, ancient writings engraved on coral items, and repeated in the language, traditions, and ethnicity of the people tell the tale of the Maldives' legacy.

In comparison to the southern islands, which are up to 800 km away, the northern islands may have had a different migratory and colonization history.

The first settlers to the southern Maldives 
A delegation from the Divi people sent gifts to the Roman Emperor Julian, according to a 4th-century note published by Ammianus Marcellinus in 362 AD. (1937, Rolfe). Divi is remarkably similar to Dheyvi, and it is possible that they are the same person. The Redi and the Kunibee, both from India's Mahrast area, were among the later settlers. The Aryas (Aryans) arrived in the Maldives about the 6th-5th century BC, roughly three centuries before Emperor Asoka built his state in India. According to folklore, they were not native to India and had arrived from another country. Hinduism was also brought to the Maldives at this period (Shihabuddine c. 1650–1687).

Dheeva Maari 
The Dheyvis found Suvadinmathi (Huvadhu Atoll) after their first settlement in Isdhuva in Isduvammathi ( Haddhunmathi ) according to Shihabuddine. These people gave the term "duva" to each island where they first lived and discovered. They established the Dheeva Maari

The first known monarch of the Dheevis 
The kingdom of Adeetta Vansa was formed in Dheeva Maari by Sri Soorudasaruna Adeettiya which was his formal name. This was the first known monarch of the Dheevis of Dheeva Maari. He founded the kingdom of Adeetta Vansa just before the kingdom of "Malik Aashooq" was created.

Dheeva Mahal 
A group of individuals from Bairat came to Dheeva Maari to preach Buddha's beliefs and works. Dheeva Mahal was the name given to Dheeva Maari during the time.

The first settlers to the northern Maldives 
According to mythology, the northern atolls of Maldives were populated by other tribes from southern India with deeper skin colors. The islands they populated were given names like Nolhivaram, Kuruhinnavaram, and Giravaram, according to legend (Shihabuddine c. 1650–1687). These islands are now known as Nolhivaramu, Hinnavaru, and Giravaru. It's probable that the names have evolved over many centuries to their current form.

Comparative studies of Maldivian oral, linguistic and cultural traditions and customs indicate that one of the earliest settlers to the northern Maldives were descendants of fishermen from the southwest coasts of present India and the northwestern shores of Sri Lanka. One such community are the Giraavaru people. They are mentioned in ancient legends and local folklore about the establishment of the capital and kingly rule in Malé.

Some argue (from the presence of Jat, Gujjar Titles and Gotra names) that Sindhis also accounted for an early layer of migration. Seafaring from Debal began during the Indus valley civilisation. The Jatakas and Puranas show abundant evidence of this maritime trade; the use of similar traditional boat building techniques in Northwestern South Asia and the Maldives, and the presence of silver punch mark coins from both regions, gives additional weight to this. There are minor signs of Southeast Asian settlers, probably some adrift from the main group of Austronesian reed boat migrants that settled Madagascar.

Kingdom of Adeetta Vansa 
The Kingdom of Adeetta Vansa (Solar Dynasty) formed in Dheeva maari ruled until the establishment of the Kingdom of Soma Vansa (Lunar Dynasty). Soma Vansa was born in Kalinja, and Adeetta Vansa was born in Kalinja as well. This kingdom was founded by the son of a Soma Vansa monarch who ruled in Kalinja at the time. Dheeva Mahal turned to Islam over a century and a half later. Sri Balaadeettiya was the first king of Soma Vansa. Queen Damahaar, his wife, was the final queen of Adeetta Vansa. So, while the dynasty's name was altered to Soma Vansa, the monarchs were still related to both Soma Vansa and Adeetta Vansa.

Kingdom of Soma Vansa 
At the start of the Soma Vansa dynasty, the Indian ruler Raja Dada invaded Dheeva Mahal's northern two atolls, Malikatholhu and Thiladunmathi, and took control of them. Sri Loakaabarana, (his son) Sri Maha Sandura, and his brother Sri Bovana Aananda were the most recent five monarchs of Soma Vansa before to the advent of Islam. After his brother, Sri Maha Sandura, passed away, he ascended to the crown.

Mahapansa 
Sri Maha Sandura's daughter, Kamanhaar (sometimes spelled Kamanaar), and Rehendihaar were exiled to the island of "Is Midu." She took Maapanansa, a book that contained the history of Adeetta Vansa's kings. In his work, Al Muhaddith Hasan claims to have read the entire Maapanansa, which was written in Copper. He also claims to have buried all of Maapanansa's parts. Sri Mahaabarana Adeettiya, Sri Bovana Aananda's son, ascended to the throne after him. The Indians who controlled Malikatholhu and Thiladunmathi, the two most northern atolls, were defeated by this King. The Indians belonged to the same tribe as Raja Dada, who was the first to conquer these two atolls. He was then given the title of monarch of 14 atolls and 2,000 islands. Malikaddu dhemedhu [between Minicoy and Addu] was his "Dheeva Mahal."

Ancient names of atolls of Maldives according to Mahapansa 

 Malikatholhu
 Thiladunmathi
 Miladunmaduva
 Maalhosmaduva
 Faadu Bur
 Mahal Atholhu
 Ari adhe Atholhu
 Felide Atholhu
 Mulakatholhu
 Nilande Atholhu
 Kolhumaduva
 Isaddunmathi
 Suvadinmathi
 Addu Fuvah Mulakatholhu

Archaeological remains of the first settlers 
These first Maldivians did not leave any archaeological remains. Their buildings were probably built of wood, palm fronds and other perishable materials, which would have quickly decayed in the salt and wind of the tropical climate. Moreover, chiefs or headmen did not reside in elaborate stone palaces, nor did their religion require the construction of large temples or compounds.

Earliest written history 
The earliest written history of the Maldives is marked by the arrival of Sinhalese people, who were descended from the exiled Magadha Prince Vijaya from the ancient city known as Sinhapura in North East India. He and his party of several hundred landed in Sri Lanka, and some in the Maldives circa 543 to 483 BC. According to the Mahavansa, one of the ships that sailed with Prince Vijaya, who went to Sri Lanka around 500 BC, went adrift and arrived at an island called Mahiladvipika, which is being identified with the Maldives. It is also said that at that time, the people from Mahiladvipika used to travel to Sri Lanka. Their settlement in Sri Lanka and the Maldives marks a significant change in demographics and the development of the Indo-Aryan language Dhivehi, which is most similar in grammar, phonology, and structure to Sinhala, and especially to the more ancient Elu Prakrit, which has less Pali.

Alternatively, it is believed that Vijaya and his clan came from western India – a claim supported by linguistic and cultural features, and specific descriptions in the epics themselves, e.g. that Vijaya visited Bharukaccha (Bharuch in Gujarat) in his ship on the voyage down south.

Philostorgius, a Greek historian of Late Antiquity, wrote of a hostage among the Romans, from the island called Diva, which is presumed to be the Maldives, who was baptised Theophilus. Theophilus was sent in the 350s to convert the Himyarites to Christianity, and went to his homeland from Arabia; he returned to Arabia, visited Axum, and settled in Antioch.

Caste system in Maldives 

Maldivian society serves as an example of a social structure that has lately shed a lot of stratification related characteristics while still perhaps holding onto certain remnants of the former caste society.

Buddhist period 

Despite being just mentioned briefly in most history books, the 1,400-year-long Buddhist period has a foundational importance in the history of the Maldives. It was during this period that the culture of the Maldives as we now know it both developed and flourished. The Maldivian language, the first Maldive scripts, the architecture, the ruling institutions, the customs and manners of the Maldivians originated at the time when the Maldives were a Buddhist kingdom.

Before embracing Buddhism as their way of life, Maldivians had practised an ancient form of Hinduism, ritualistic traditions known as Śrauta, in the form of venerating the Surya (the ancient ruling caste were of Aadheetta or Suryavanshi origins).

Buddhism probably spread to the Maldives in the 3rd century BC, at the time of Aśoka. Nearly all archaeological remains in the Maldives are from Buddhist stupas and monasteries, and all artifacts found to date display characteristic Buddhist iconography.
Buddhist (and Hindu) temples were Mandala shaped, they are oriented according to the four cardinal points, the main gate being towards the east. The ancient Buddhist stupas are called "havitta", "hatteli" or "ustubu" by the Maldivians according to the different atolls. These stupas and other archaeological remains, like foundations of Buddhist buildings Vihara, compound walls and stone baths, are found on many islands of the Maldives. They usually lie buried under mounds of sand and covered by vegetation. Local historian Hassan Ahmed Maniku counted as many as 59 islands with Buddhist archaeological sites in a provisional list he published in 1990. The largest monuments of the Buddhist era are in the islands fringing the eastern side of Haddhunmathi Atoll.

In the early 11th century, the Minicoy and Thiladhunmathi, and possibly other northern Atolls, were conquered by the medieval Chola Tamil emperor Raja Raja Chola I, thus becoming a part of the Chola Empire.

Unification of the archipelago is traditionally attributed to King Koimala. 
According to a legend from Maldivian folklore, in the early 12th century AD, a medieval prince named Koimala, a nobleman of the Lion Race from Sri Lanka, sailed to Rasgetheemu island (literally "Town of the Royal House", or figuratively "King's Town") in the North Maalhosmadulu Atoll, and from there to Malé, and established a kingdom, named Dheeva Mari Kingdom. By then, the Aadeetta (Sun) Dynasty (the Suryavanshi ruling cast) had for some time ceased to rule in Malé, possibly because of invasions by the Cholas of Southern India in the 10th century. Koimala Kalou (Lord Koimala), who reigned as King Maanaabarana, was a king of the Homa (Lunar) Dynasty (the Chandravanshi ruling cast), which some historians call the House of Theemuge.
The Homa (Lunar) dynasty sovereigns intermarried with the Aaditta (Sun) Dynasty. This is why the formal titles of Maldive kings until 1968 contained references to "kula sudha ira", which means "descended from the Moon and the Sun". No official record exists of the Aadeetta dynasty's reign. Since Koimala's reign, the Maldive throne was also known as the Singaasana (Lion Throne). Before then, and in some situations since, it was also known as the Saridhaaleys (Ivory Throne). Some historians credit Koimala with freeing the Maldives from Chola rule.

Western interest in the archaeological remains of early cultures on the Maldives began with the work of H.C.P. Bell, a British commissioner of the Ceylon Civil Service. Bell was first ordered to the islands in late 1879 and returned several times to the Maldives to investigate ancient ruins. He studied the ancient mounds, called havitta or ustubu (these names are derived from chaitiya and stupa) by the Maldivians, which are found on many of the atolls.

Early scholars like H.C.P. Bell, who resided in Sri Lanka most of his life, claim that Buddhism came to the Maldives from Sri Lanka and that the ancient Maldivians had followed Theravada Buddhism. Since then, new archaeological discoveries point to Mahayana and Vajrayana Buddhist influences, which are likely to have come to the islands straight from the Subcontinent. An urn discovered in Maalhos (Ari Atoll) in the 1980s has a Vishvavajra inscribed with Protobengali script. This text was in the same script used in the ancient Buddhist centres of learning in Nalanda and Vikramashila. There is also a small Porites stupa in the Museum where the directional Dhyani Buddhas (Jinas) are etched in its four cardinal points as in the Mahayana tradition. Some coral blocks with fearsome heads of guardians are also displaying Vajrayana Iconography. Buddhist remains have been also found in Minicoy Island, then part of the Maldive Kingdom, by the Archaeological Survey of India (ASI), in the latter half of the 20th century. Among these remains a Buddha head and stone foundations of a Vihara deserve special mention.

In the mid-1980s, the Maldivian government allowed Norwegian explorer Thor Heyerdahl to excavate ancient sites. Heyerdahl studied the ancient mounds, called havitta by the Maldivians, found on many of the atolls. Some of his archaeological discoveries of stone figures and carvings from pre-Islamic civilizations are today exhibited in a side room of the small National Museum on Male. Heyerdahl's research indicates that as early as 2,000 B.C. Maldives lay on the maritime trading routes of early Egyptian, Mesopotamian, and Indus Valley civilizations.

Islamic period

Introduction of Islam 

The importance of the Arabs as traders in the Indian Ocean by the 12th century may partly explain why the last Buddhist king of Maldives Dhovemi converted to Islam in the year 1153 (or 1193, as certain copper plate grants give a later date). The king thereupon adopted the Muslim title and name of Sultan Muhammad al Adil, initiating a series of six dynasties consisting of eighty-four sultans and sultanas that lasted until 1932 when the sultanate became elective. The formal title of the Sultan up to 1965 was, Sultan of Land and Sea, Lord of the twelve-thousand islands and Sultan of the Maldives which came with the style Highness.

The person traditionally deemed responsible for this conversion was a Sunni Muslim visitor named Abu al-Barakat Yusuf al-Barbari. His venerated tomb now stands on the grounds of Medhu Ziyaaraiy across the street from the Hukuru Mosque in the capital Malé. Built in 1656, this is the oldest mosque in Malé.

Following the Islamic concept that before Islam there was the time of Jahiliya (ignorance), in the history books used by Maldivians the introduction of Islam at the end of the 12th century is considered the cornerstone of the country's history.

Compared to the other areas of South Asia, the conversion of the Maldives to Islam happened relatively late. Arab Traders had converted populations in the Malabar Coast since the 7th century, and the Arab conqueror Muhammad Bin Qāsim had converted large swathes of Sindh to Islam at about the same time. The Maldives remained a Buddhist kingdom for another five hundred years (perhaps the south-westernmost Buddhist country) until the conversion to Islam.

The document known as Dhanbidhū Lōmāfānu gives information about the suppression of Buddhism in the southern Haddhunmathi Atoll, which had been a major center of that religion. Monks were taken to Male and beheaded, The Satihirutalu (the chattravali or chattrayashti crowning a stupa) were broken to disfigure the numerous stupasm and the statues of Vairocana, the transcendent Buddha of the middle world region, were destroyed. 

Arab interest in Maldives also was reflected in the residence there in the 1340s of Ibn Battutah. The well-known North African traveler wrote how a Moroccan, one Abu al-Barakat Yusuf al-Barbari, was believed to have been responsible for spreading Islam in the islands, reportedly convincing the local king after having subdued Ranna Maari, a demon coming from the sea. Even though this report has been contested in later sources, it does explain some crucial aspects of Maldivian culture. For instance, historically Arabic has been the prime language of administration there, instead of the Persian and Urdu languages used in the nearby Muslim states. Another link to North Africa was the Maliki school of jurisprudence, used throughout most of North Africa, which was the official one in the Maldives until the 17th century.

Berber Muslim Abu al-Barakat Yusuf al-Barbari, is traditionally credited for this conversion. According to the story told to Ibn Battutah, a mosque was built with the inscription: 'The Sultan Ahmad Shanurazah accepted Islam at the hand of Abu al-Barakat Yusuf al-Barbari.' Some scholars have suggested the possibility of Ibn Battuta misreading Maldive texts, and having a bias towards the North African, Maghrebi narrative of this Shaykh, instead of the East African origins account that was known as well at the time. Even when Ibn Battuta visited the islands, the governor of the island at that time was Abd Aziz Al Mogadishawi, a Somali.

Scholars have posited another scenario where Abu al-Barakat Yusuf al-Barbari might have been a native of Barbera, a significant trading port on the northwestern coast of Somalia. Barbara or Barbaroi (Berbers), as the ancestors of the Somalis were referred to by medieval Arab and ancient Greek geographers, respectively. This is also seen when Ibn Batuta visited Mogadishu, he mentions that the Sultan at that time, "Abu Bakr ibn Shaikh Omar", was a Berber. Ibn Batuta states the Maldivian king was converted by Abu al-Barakat Yusuf al-Barbari (Meaning Abdul Barakat the Berber).

Another interpretation, held by the more reliable local historical chronicles, Raadavalhi and Taarikh, is that Abu al-Barakat Yusuf al-Barbari was Abdul Barakat Yusuf Shams ud-Dīn at-Tabrīzī, also locally known as Tabrīzugefānu. In the Arabic script the words al-Barbari and al-Tabrizi are very much alike, owing to the fact that at the time, Arabic had several consonants that looked identical and could only be differentiated by overall context (this has since changed by addition of dots above or below letters to clarify pronunciation – For example, the letter "B" in modern Arabic has a dot below, whereas the letter "T" looks identical except there are two dots above it). "ٮوسڡ الٮٮرٮرى" could be read as "Yusuf at-Tabrizi" or "Yusuf al-Barbari".

Cowrie shells and coir trade 

Inhabitants of the Middle East became interested in Maldives due to its strategic location. Middle Eastern seafarers had just begun to take over the Indian Ocean trade routes in the 10th century and found Maldives to be an important link in those routes. The Maldives was the first landfall for traders from Basra, sailing to Sri Lanka or Southeast Asia. Bengal was one of the principal trading partners of the Maldives. Trade involved mainly cowrie shells and coir fiber.

The Maldives had and abundant supply of cowrie shells, a form of currency that was widely used throughout Asia and parts of the East African coast since ancient times. Shell currency imported from the Maldives was used as legal tender in the Bengal Sultanate and Mughal Bengal, alongside gold and silver. The Maldives received rice in exchange for cowry shells. The Bengal-Maldives cowry shell trade was the largest shell currency trade network in history. In the Maldives, ships could take on fresh water, fruit and the delicious, basket-smoked red flesh of the black bonito, a delicacy exported to Sindh, China and Yemen. The people of the archipelago were described as gentle, civilised and hospitable. They produced brass utensils as well as fine cotton textiles, exported in the form of sarongs and turban lengths. These local industries must have depended on imported raw materials.

The other essential product of the Maldives was coir, the fibre of the dried coconut husk. Cured in pits, beaten, spun and then twisted into cordage and ropes, coir's salient quality is its resistance to saltwater. It stitched together and rigged the dhows that plied the Indian Ocean. Maldivian coir was exported to Sindh, China, Yemen, and the Persian Gulf. 
"It is stronger than hemp", wrote Ibn Battuta, "and is used to sew together the planks of Sindhi and Yemeni dhows, for this sea abounds in reefs, and if the planks were fastened with iron nails, they would break into pieces when the vessel hit a rock. The coir gives the boat greater elasticity, so that it doesn't break up."

Colonial Period

Portuguese and Dutch hegemony 
In 1558 the Portuguese established themselves in the Maldives, which they administered from their main colony in Goa. They tried to impose Christianity on the locals. Fifteen years later, a local leader named Muhammad Thakurufaanu al-A'uẓam organized a popular revolt and drove the Portuguese out of Maldives. This event is now commemorated as National Day, and a small museum and memorial center honor the hero on his home island of Utheemu on North Thiladhummathi Atoll.

In the mid-17th century, the Dutch, who had replaced the Portuguese as the dominant power in Ceylon, established hegemony over Maldivian affairs without involving themselves directly in local matters, which were governed according to centuries-old Islamic customs.

British protectorate 

The British expelled the Dutch from Ceylon in 1796 and included Maldives as a British protected area.

Britain got entangled with the Maldives as a result of domestic disturbances which targeted the settler community of Bora merchants who were British subjects in the 1860s. Rivalry between two dominant families, the Athireege clan and the Kakaage clan was resolved with former winning the favour of the British authorities in Ceylon. The status of Maldives as a British protectorate was officially recorded in an 1887 agreement.

On 16 December 1887, the Sultan of the Maldives signed a contract with the British Governor of Ceylon turning the Maldives into a British protected state, thus giving up the islands' sovereignty in matters of foreign policy, but retaining internal self-government. The British government promised military protection and non-interference in local administration, which continued to be regulated by Muslim traditional institutions, in exchange for an annual tribute. The status of the islands was akin to other British protectorates in the Indian Ocean region, including Zanzibar and the Trucial States.

During the British era, which lasted until 1965, Maldives continued to be ruled under a succession of sultans. It was a period during which the Sultan's authority and powers were increasingly and decisively taken over by the Chief Minister, much to the chagrin of the British Governor-General who continued to deal with the ineffectual Sultan. Consequently, Britain encouraged the development of a constitutional monarchy, and the first Constitution was proclaimed in 1932. However, the new arrangements favoured neither the aging Sultan nor the wily Chief Minister, but rather a young crop of British-educated reformists. As a result, angry mobs were instigated against the Constitution, which was publicly torn up.

The Maldives were only marginally touched by the Second World War. The Italian auxiliary cruiser Ramb I was sunk off Addu Atoll in 1941.

After the death of Sultan Majeed Didi and his son, the members of the parliament elected Muhammad Amin Didi as the next person in line to succeed the sultan. But Didi refused to take up the throne. So, a referendum was held and Maldives became a republic, with Amin Didi as first elected President, having abolished the 812-year-old sultanate. While serving as prime minister during the 1940s, Didi nationalized the fish export industry. As president he is remembered as a reformer of the education system and a promoter of women's rights. Yet, while he was in Ceylon for medical treatment, a revolution was brought by the people of Malé, headed by his deputy Velaanaagey Ibraahim Didi. When Amin Did returned he was confined to Dhoonidhoo Island. He escaped to Malé and tried to take control of Bandeyrige, but was beaten by an angry mob and died soon after.

After the fall of President Mohamed Amin Didi, a referendum was held and 98% of the people voted in favour of restoration of the monarchy, so the country was again declared a Sultanate. A new People's Majilis was elected, as the former had been dissolved after the end of the revolution. The members of the special majilis decided to take a secret vote to elect a sultan, and Prince Muhammad Fareed Didi was elected as the 84th Sultan in 1954. His first Prime minister was Ehgamugey Ibraahim Ali Didi (later Ibraahim Faamuladheyri Kilegefaan). On 11 December 1957, the prime minister was forced to resign and Velaanagey Ibrahim Nasir was elected as the new prime minister the following day.

British military presence and Suvadive secession 

Beginning in the 1950s, political history in Maldives was largely influenced by the British military presence in the islands. In 1954 the restoration of the sultanate perpetuated the rule of the past. Two years later, the United Kingdom obtained permission to reestablish its wartime RAF Gan airfield in the southernmost Addu Atoll. Maldives granted the British a 100-year lease on Gan that required them to pay £2,000 a year, as well as some 440,000 square metres on Hitaddu for radio installations. This served as a staging post for British military flights to the Far East and Australia, replacing RAF Mauripur in Pakistan which had been relinquished in 1956.

In 1957, however, the new prime minister, Ibrahim Nasir, called for a review of the agreement in the interest of shortening the lease and increasing the annual payment, and announced a new tax on boats. But Nasir was challenged in 1959 by a local secessionist movement in the southern atolls that benefited economically from the British presence on Gan. This group cut ties with the Maldives government and formed an independent state, the United Suvadive Republic, with Abdullah Afif as president. The short-lived state (1959–63) had a combined population of 20,000 inhabitants scattered over Huvadu, Addu and Fua Mulaku. Afeef pleaded for support and recognition from Britain in the edition of 25 May 1959 of The Times of London.

Instead the initial British measure of lukewarm support for the small breakaway nation was withdrawn in 1961, when the British signed a treaty with the Maldive Islands without involving Afeef. Following that treaty the Suvadives had to endure an economic embargo. In 1962 Nasir sent gunboats from Malé with government police on board to eliminate elements opposed to his rule. One year later the Suvadive republic was scrapped and Abdullah Afif went into exile to the Seychelles, where he died in 1993.

Meanwhile, in 1960 the Maldives had allowed the United Kingdom to continue to use both the Gan and the Hitaddu facilities for a thirty-year period, with the payment of £750,000 over the period of 1960 to 1965 for the purpose of Maldives' economic development.

The base was closed in 1976 as part of the larger British withdrawal of permanently stationed forces 'East of Suez' initiated by Labour government of Harold Wilson.

Independence
On 26 July 1965, Maldives gained independence under an agreement signed with United Kingdom. The British government retained the use of the Gan and Hithadhoo facilities. In a national referendum in March 1968, Maldivians abolished the sultanate and established a republic.

In line with the broader British policy of decolonisation on 26 July 1965 an agreement was signed on behalf of His Majesty the Sultan by Ibrahim Nasir Rannabandeyri Kilegefan, Prime Minister, and on behalf of Her Majesty The Queen by Sir Michael Walker, British Ambassador designate to the Maldive Islands, which ended the British responsibility for the defence and external affairs of the Maldives. The islands thus achieved full political independence, with the ceremony taking place at the British High Commissioner's Residence in Colombo. After this, the sultanate continued for another three years under Muhammad Fareed Didi, who declared himself King rather than Sultan.

On 15 November 1967, a vote was taken in parliament to decide whether the Maldives should continue as a constitutional monarchy or become a republic. Of the 44 members of parliament, forty voted in favour of a republic. On 15 March 1968, a national referendum was held on the question, and 81.23% of those taking part voted in favour of establishing a republic. The republic was declared on 11 November 1968, thus ending the 853-year-old monarchy, which was replaced by a republic under the presidency of Ibrahim Nasir, the former prime minister. As the King had held little real power, this was seen as a cosmetic change and required few alterations in the structures of government.

Nasir Presidency
The Second Republic was proclaimed in November 1968 under the presidency of Ibrahim Nasir, who had increasingly dominated the political scene. Under the new constitution, Nasir was elected indirectly to a four-year presidential term by the Majlis (legislature) and his candidacy later ratified by referendum. He appointed Ahmed Zaki as the new prime minister.

In 1973 Nasir was elected to a second term under the constitution as amended in 1972, which extended the presidential term to five years and which also provided for the election of the prime minister by the Majlis. In March 1975, newly elected prime minister Zaki was arrested in a bloodless coup and was banished to a remote atoll. Observers suggested that Zaki was becoming too popular and hence posed a threat to the Nasir faction.

During the 1970s, the economic situation in Maldives suffered a setback when the Sri Lankan market for Maldives' main export of dried fish collapsed. Adding to the problems was the British decision in 1975 to close its airfield on Gan. A steep commercial decline followed the evacuation of Gan in March 1976. As a result, the popularity of Nasir's government suffered. Maldives's 20-year period of authoritarian rule under Nasir abruptly ended in 1978 when he fled to Singapore. A subsequent investigation revealed that he had absconded with millions of dollars from the state treasury.

Nasir is widely credited with modernising the long-isolated and nearly unknown Maldives and opening them up to the rest of the world, including by building the first international airport (Malé International Airport, 1966) and bringing the Maldives to United Nations membership. He laid the foundations of the nation by modernising the fisheries industry with mechanized vessels and starting the tourism industry – the two prime drivers of today's Maldivian economy.
He was credited with many other improvements such as introducing an English-based modern curriculum to government-run schools and granting vote to Maldivian women in 1964. He brought television and radio to the country with formation of Television Maldives and Radio Maldives for broadcasting radio signals nationwide. He abolished Vaaru, a tax on the people living on islands outside Malé.

Tourism in the Maldives began to be developed by the beginning of the 1970s. The first resort in the Maldives was Kurumba Maldives which welcomed the first guests on 3 October 1972. The first accurate census was held in December 1977 and showed 142,832 persons residing in Maldives. When Nasir relinquished power Maldives was debt-free and the national shipping line with more than 40 ships remained a source of national pride.

Nasir was criticized for his authoritarian methods against opponents and for his iron-fisted methods in handling an insurrection by the Addu islanders who formed a short-lived breakaway government – United Suvadives Republic – with closer ties to the British.
Nasir's hasty introduction of the Latin alphabet (Malé Latin) in 1976 instead of local Thaana script – reportedly to allow for the use of telex machines in the local administration – was widely criticised. Clarence Maloney, a Maldives-based U.S. anthropologist, lamented the inconsistencies of the "Dhivehi Latin" which ignored all previous linguistic research on the Maldivian language and did not follow the modern Standard Indic transliteration. At the time of the romanization every island's officials were required to use only one script and they became illiterate overnight. Officials were relieved when the Tāna script was reinstated by President Maumoon shortly after he took power in 1978. However, Malé Latin continues to be widely used.

Maumoon Presidency

As Ibrahim Nasir's second term was coming to an end, he decided not to seek re-election and, in June 1978, the Majlis was called upon to nominate a presidential candidate. Nasir received 45 votes (despite his stated intention not to seek re-election), with the remaining 3 votes for Maumoon Abdul Gayoom, a former university lecturer and Maldivian ambassador to the United Nations. Another ballot was called on 16 June. Maumoon received 27 votes, allowing his name to be put forward as the sole candidate. Five months later, he was elected the new President of the Maldives, with 92.96% of the votes (he would be later re-elected five times as the sole candidate). The peaceful election was seen as ushering in a period of political stability and economic development in view of Maumoon's priority to develop the poorer islands. In 1978 Maldives joined the International Monetary Fund and the World Bank. Tourism also gained in importance to the local economy, reaching more than 120,000 visitors in 1985. The local populace appeared to benefit from increased tourism and the corresponding increase in foreign contacts involving various development projects.

There were three attempts to overthrow Maumoon's government during the 1980s – in 1980, 1983 and 1988.

Whereas the 1980 and 1983 coup attempts against Maumoon's presidency were not considered serious, the third coup attempt in November 1988 alarmed the international community, as about 80 armed mercenaries of the PLOTE Tamil militant group landed on Malé before dawn aboard used cargo vessels which had taken almost 2 days to arrive Male' and failed in controlling the capital city. The plan was ill-prepared and by noon the PLOTE militants and the Maldivian allies fled the country realising they had already lost. soon after the militants had left the Indian Military arrived on the request of President Gayyoom, and their gun ships chased the ships that were been used as get away boats by the PLOTE militants. Nineteen people died in the fighting, and several taken hostage also died when the Indian Gunships fired on the Vessel carrying the hostages. Mercenaries, and later also the mastermind of the attempted coup, were tried and sentenced to death, later commuted to life in prison. Some were later pardoned.

Despite coup attempts, Maumoon served three more presidential terms. In the 1983, 1988, and 1993 elections, Maumoon received more than 95% of the vote. Although the government did not allow any legal opposition, Maumoon was opposed in the early 1990s by the growth of Islamist radicalisation and by some powerful local business leaders.

Maumoon's tenure was marked by several allegations of corruption as well as allegations of autocratic rule, human rights abuses and corruption. 
Maumoon's opponents and international human rights groups had accused him of employing terror tactics against dissidents, such as arbitrary arrests, detention without trial, employing torture, forced confessions, and politically motivated killings.

21st century

Democratisation 

During the later part of Maumoon's rule, independent political movements emerged in Maldives, which challenged the then-ruling Dhivehi Rayyithunge Party (Maldivian People's Party, MPP) and demanded democratic reform.
Since 2003, following the death in custody of a prisoner, Naseem, the Maldives experienced several anti-government demonstrations calling for political reforms, more freedoms, and an end to torture and oppression. 
The dissident journalist Mohamed Nasheed rose to challenge the autocratic rule of Maumoon. Nasheed was imprisoned a total of 16 times under Maumoon's rule. Persisting in his activism, he founded the Maldivian Democratic Party (MDP) in 2003 while in exile. His activism, as well as civil unrest that year, pressured Maumoon into allowing for gradual political reforms.

Violent protests broke out in Malé on 20 September 2003 after Evan Naseem, a prisoner, was killed in Maafushi Prison, after the most brutal torture, by prison staff. An attempt to cover up the death was foiled when the mother of the dead man discovered the marks of torture on his body and made the knowledge public, therefore triggering the riots. A subsequent disturbance at the prison resulted in three deaths when police guards at the prison opened fire on unarmed inmates. Several government buildings were set on fire during the riots. As a result of pressure from reformists, the junior prison guards responsible for Naseem's death were subsequently tried, convicted and sentenced in 2005 in what was believed to be a show trial that avoided the senior officers involved being investigated. The report of an inquiry into the prison shootings was heavily censored by the Government, citing "national security" grounds. Pro-reformists claim this was in order to cover-up the chain of authority and circumstances that led to the killings.

There were fresh protests in the capital city of Maldives, Malé on 13 August 2004, (Black Friday), which appear to have begun as a demand for the release of four political activists from detention. Beginning on the evening of 12 August 2004, up to 5,000 demonstrators got involved. This unplanned and unorganized demonstration was the largest such protest in the country's history. Protesters initially demanding the freeing of the pro-reformists arrested on the afternoon of 12 August 2004. As the protest continued to grow, people demanded the resignation of president Maumoon Abdul Gayoom, who had been in power since 1978. 
What started as a peaceful demonstration ended after 22 hours, as the country's darkest day in recent history. Several people were severely injured as personnel from the Maldivian National Security Service (NSS) – later Maldivian National Defence Force – used riot batons and teargas on unarmed civilians.
After two police officers were reportedly stabbed, allegedly by government agents provocateurs, President Maumoon declared a State of Emergency and suppressed the demonstration, suspending all human rights guaranteed under the Constitution, banning demonstrations and the expression of views critical of the government. At least 250 pro-reform protesters were arrested. As part of the state of emergency, and to prevent independent reporting of events, the government shut off Internet access and some mobile telephony services to Maldives on 13 and 14 August 2004.

As a result of these activities, political parties were eventually allowed in June 2005. The main parties registered in Maldives are: the Maldivian Democratic Party (MDP), the Dhivehi Raiyyithunge Party (DRP), the Islamic Democratic Party (IDP) and the Adhaalath Party, also known as the Adhaalath Party. The first party to register was the MDP headed by popular opposition figures such as Mohamed Nasheed (Anni) and Mohamed Latheef (Gogo). The next was the Dhivehi Raiyyithunge Party (DRP) headed by then-President Maumoon.

New civil unrest broke out in Malé, Gaafu Dhaalu Atoll and Addu Atoll of the Maldives on 12 August 2005 which led to events that supported the democratic reform of the country. This unrest was provoked by the arrest of Mohamed Nasheed – an open critic of the president Maumoon Abdul Gayoom – and the subsequent demolition of the Dhunfini tent, used by the members of the Maldivian Democratic Party (MDP) for their gatherings. Supporters of MDP were quick to demonstrate. They started calling for the resignation of Maumoon Abdul Gayoom, soon after Nasheed's arrest. Several arrests were made on the first night followed by the demolition of the Dhunfini tent. The demolition complicated the situation further provoking the unrest. The unrest grew violent on the third night, on 14 August 2005, due to the methods used in the attempts by the authority to stop the demonstration.
The unrest continued intermittently for three nights, from 12 to 14 August 2005. By 15 August 2005, the uprising was controlled with the presence of heavy security around Malé. Almost a fourth of the city had to be cordoned off during the unrest.

Tsunami impact 

On 26 December 2004, following the 2004 Indian Ocean earthquake, the Maldives were devastated by a tsunami. Only nine islands were reported to have escaped any flooding, while fifty-seven islands faced serious damage to critical infrastructure, fourteen islands had to be totally evacuated, and six islands were destroyed. A further twenty-one resort islands were forced to close because of serious damage. The total damage was estimated at more than US$400 million, or some 62% of the GDP. 102 Maldivians and 6 foreigners reportedly died in the tsunami. The destructive impact of the waves on the low-lying islands was mitigated by the fact there was no continental shelf or land mass upon which the waves could gain height.

Nasheed Presidency 

The protest movements brought about significant change in political structure. A new Constitution was ratified in August 2008, paving the way for the country's first multi-party presidential election two months later. 
Standing as the DRP candidate, Maumoon lost in the election's second round, in which he received 45.75% of the vote against 54.25% for his opponents, MDP's Presidential Candidate Mohamed Nasheed accordingly succeeded Maumoon as president on 11 November 2008, with Gaumee Itthihaad's Candidate Mohammed Waheed Hassan in the new post of Vice President. The 2009 parliamentary election saw the Maldivian Democratic Party of President Nasheed receive the most votes with 30.81%, gaining 26 seats, although Maumoon's MPP, with 24.62% of the vote, received the most seats (28).

The government of President Mohamed Nasheed faced many challenges, including the huge debt left by the previous government, the economic downturn following the 2004 tsunami, overspending (by means of overprinting of local currency rufiyaa) during his regime, unemployment, corruption, and increasing drug use.

Taxation on goods was imposed for the first time in the country, and import duties were reduced in many goods and services. Social welfare benefits were given to those above 65 years of age, single parents, and those with special needs. On 10 November 2008, Nasheed announced an intent to create a sovereign wealth fund with money earned from tourism that could be used to purchase land elsewhere for the Maldives people to relocate should rising sea levels due to climate change inundate the country. The government reportedly considered locations in Sri Lanka and India due to cultural and climate similarities, and as far away as Australia.
An October 2009 cabinet meeting was held underwater (ministers wore scuba gear and communicated with hand signals) to publicise to the wider world the threat of global warming on the low-lying islands of the Maldives.

A series of peaceful protests that broke out in the Maldives on 1 May 2011. They would continue, eventually escalating into the resignation of President Mohamed Nasheed in disputed circumstances in February 2012.

Demonstrators were protesting what they considered the government's mismanagement of the economy and were calling for the ouster of President Mohamed Nasheed. The main political opposition party in the country, the Dhivehi Rayyithunge Party (Maldivian People's Party) led by former president Maumoon Abdul Gayoom accused President Nasheed of "talking about democracy but not putting it into practice." 
The primary cause for the protests was rising commodity prices and a poor economic situation in the country.

Waheed Presidency 

Nasheed resigned on 7 February 2012 following weeks of protests after he ordered the military to arrest Abdulla Mohamed, the Chief Justice of the Criminal Court, on 16 January. Maldives police joined the protesters after refusing to use force on them and took over the state-owned television station forcibly switching the broadcast opposition party leader Maumoon Abdul Gayoom's call for people to come out to protest. The Maldives Army then clashed with police and other protesters who were with the police. All this time none of the protesters tried to invade any security facility including headquarters of MNDF. The Chief Justice was released from detention after Nasheed resigned from his post.

Vice President Mohammed Waheed Hassan Manik was sworn as the new president of Maldives. Former President Nasheed's supporters clashed with the security personnel during a rally on 12 July 2012, seeking ouster of President Waheed.

Nasheed stated the following day that he was forced out of office at gunpoint, while Waheed supporters maintained that the transfer of power was voluntary and constitutional. 
A later British Commonwealth meeting concluded that it could not "determine conclusively the constitutionality of the resignation of President Nasheed", but called for an international investigation. The Maldives' National Commission of Inquiry, appointed to investigate the matter, found that there was no evidence to support Nasheed's version of events.

Many countries, including the United States and the United Kingdom, were quick to abandon Nasheed, instead endorsing his successor. (The United States backtracked in late 2012 in response to widespread criticism.) On 23 February 2012, the Commonwealth suspended the Maldives from its democracy and human rights watchdog while the ousting was being investigated, and backed Nasheed's call for elections before the end of 2012.

On 8 October, Nasheed was arrested after failing to appear in court to face charges that he ordered the illegal arrest of a judge while in office. However, his supporters claim that this detention was politically motivated in order to prevent him from campaigning for the 2013 presidential elections.

In March 2013 the former president Nasheed was convicted under the country's terrorism laws for ordering the arrest of an allegedly corrupt judge in 2012 and jailed for 13 years. Maldives' international partners – including the EU, US, UK and the United Nations – have said his rushed trial was seriously flawed following a UN panel ruling in the former president's favour. The UN Working Group on Arbitrary Detention has called for his immediate release. Nasheed appealed also to Indian Prime Minister Narendra Modi.

Yameen Presidency 

At the time Nasheed was jailed, President Mohammed Waheed Hassan announced a presidential election would be held in 2013.
The elections in late 2013 were highly contested. Former president Mohammed Nasheed won the most votes in the first round. Contrary to the assessment of international election observers, the Supreme Court cited irregularities and annulled it. In the end, the opposition combined to gain a majority. Abdulla Yameen, half-brother of the former president Maumoon, assumed the presidency.

Yameen implemented a foreign policy shift towards increased engagement with China, establishing diplomatic relations between the two countries. Yameen employed Islam as a tool of identity politics, framing religious mobilisation as the solution to perceived Western attempts to undermine Maldivian national sovereignty. Yameen's policy of connecting Islam with anti-Western rhetoric represented a new development.

On 28 September 2015 there was an assassination attempt on President Abdulla Yameen as he was returning from Saudi Arabia after the hajj pilgrimage. As his speedboat was docking at Male there was an explosion on board. Amid screams, the right door of the boat fell on the jetty and there was heavy smoke. Three people were injured, including his wife, but the President managed to escape unhurt.

In a probe of the explosion targeting president, on 24 October 2015 Maldives vice president Ahmed Adeeb was arrested at the airport upon his return from a conference in China. 17 of Adheeb's supporters were also arrested for "public order offences". The government instituted a broader crackdown against political dissent.

On 4 November 2015, President Abdulla Yameen declared a 30-day state of emergency ahead of a planned anti-government rally.
The next day, as per the State of Emergency bill made by the President, the people's Majlis decided to rush the process for the removal of Vice president Ahmed Adeeb by a no confidence vote that was submitted by PPM Parliament than the originally intended period. As a result, the Majlis passed the no confidence vote with a majority of 61 members favouring it, removing Adeeb from the post of Vice President in the process.
On 10 November 2015, President Yameen revoked the State of Emergency citing that no imminent threats remained in the country.

Growth of Islamic Radicalism

Though the popular image of the Maldives is that of a holiday paradise, its radicalised youths are enlisting in significant numbers to fight for Islamic State militants in the Middle East.

In the late 1990s Wahhabism challenged more traditional moderate practices. After the 2004 tsunami, Saudi-funded preachers gained influence. Within a short period of a decade fundamentalist practices dominated the culture. The Guardian estimates that 50–100 fighters have joined ISIS and al Qaeda from the Maldives. The Financial Times puts the number at 200. Most radicals are young men who suffer from lethargy, unemployment, drug abuse, and the need to prove their masculinity. Radicalization often happens in jail where the "only thing to read is the Qur'an or religious literature. There are also lots of older militants and young guys look up to them."

Ibrahim Mohamed Solih presidency

Ibrahim Mohamed Solih was selected as the new presidential candidate for the coalition of opposition parties in the 2018 election, when former president Mohamed Nasheed changed his mind about running.  In the 2018 elections Ibrahim Mohamed Solih won the most votes, and he sworn in as the Maldives new president on 17 November 2018, when the five-year term of Abdulla Yameen expired. Solih became the 7th President of the Maldives and the country's third democratically elected president. He promised to fight against widespread corruption and investigate the human rights abuses of the previous regime. There was also a change in foreign relations. His predecessor Abdulla Yameen was politically very close to China with some "anti-India" attitude, but president Solih reaffirmed previous "India-First Policy", and Maldives and India strengthened their close relationship.

On 19 November 2018, Solih announced that the Maldives is to return to the Commonwealth of Nations, a decision recommended by his Cabinet, considering that the Maldives was a republic in the Commonwealth of Nations from 1982 to 2016. On 1 February 2020, Maldives officially re-joined the Commonwealth.

In April 2019 parliamentary election The Maldivian Democratic Party (MDP) of president Ibrahim Mohamed Solih won a landslide victory. It took 65 of 87 seats of the parliament. This was the first time a single party was able to get such a high number of seats in the parliament in Maldivian history. Former president Abdulla Yameen was sentenced to five years in prison in November 2019 for money laundering. The High Court upheld the jail sentence in January 2021. The Supreme Court acquitted Yameen from the charges on the 30th of November 2021 due to the lack of substantial evidence.

See also

 Hinduism in Maldives
 History of Asia
 History of India
 History of South Asia
 List of Sultans of the Maldives
 List of presidents of the Maldives
 Maldivian Folklore
 National Museum of the Maldives
 National Library of Maldives
 Politics of the Maldives
 Sultanate of Maldives

References

Works cited

 
Maldives, The